Europe Today may refer to:

 Europe Today (play), a 2011 Slovene play with music
 Europe Today (radio programme), a 1991–2011 radio programme broadcast on BBC World Service
 Europe Today (TV programme), a 1998–2001 morning business news television programme broadcast on CNBC Europe